Vuosjärvi is a  medium-sized lake of Finland in northern Central Finland, Kannonkoski and Viitasaari. The water flows from Lake Kivijärvi through Hilmo Power Station and the water continues to the Huopanankoski rapids. Near the power station there are Hilmonjoki rapids, too. The lake is quite shallow and good for fishing lake forells and zanders.

See also
List of lakes in Finland

References

Landforms of Central Finland
Lakes of Viitasaari
Lakes of Kannonkoski